Ticciati is an Italian surname. Notable persons with this name include:
Francesco Ticciati (1893–1949), Italian composer, concert pianist, piano teacher and lecturer
Girolamo Ticciati (1676–1744), Italian sculptor and architect
Hugo Ticciati (born 1980), British-born violinist living in Sweden
Robin Ticciati (born 1983), British conductor